Guaraqueçaba Ecological Station is an ecological station in the municipality of Guaraqueçaba, Paraná, Brazil.

Location

It is in the coastal marine biome.
It is administered by the Chico Mendes Institute for Biodiversity Conservation.
It lies within the Guaraqueçaba municipality of the state of Paraná.
The ecological reserve is fully contained in the Guaraqueçaba Environmental Protection Area (Área de Proteção Ambiental de Guaraqueçaba).
It is part of the Lagamar mosaic.

Environment

The region is a flat area of unconsolidated sediment of continental and marine origins.
The conservation unit is in the Benito creek at the confluence of the mouths of the Tagaçaba and Serra Negra rivers, the Itaqui creek at the confluence of the mouths of the Pacotuva and Boquaçu rivers, and in the mouths of the Guaraqueçaba, Poruquara, Birigui and Sabuí rivers.
There are numerous channels and black water pools between these estuaries.
The unit covers areas of mangroves to the west of the Baía dos Pinheiros, to the north of the Baía de Guaraqueçaba  and to the west of the Enseada do Benito, as well as the islands of Laranjeiras, Rabelo, Pavoçá, Sambaqui, Bananas and Galheta.

The station lies in the humid tropical zone with high rainfall, particularly from February to April.
The vegetation is Atlantic rain forest, transitional forests and mangroves.
The Rhizophora mangle, Laguncularia racemosa and Avicennia schaueriana are the main trees of the mangrove, and flower from March to October. They are arranging into clearly defined zones, with the Rhizophora mangle closest to the river margin.
In addition to fish and birds, there are many species of crustaceans, molluscs and other invertebrates in the mangroves.

Conservation

The Ecological Station is a "strict nature reserve" under IUCN protected area category Ia.
The station was created to preserve the mangrove and island ecosystem, protect endangered species, maintain gene banks and support scientific research.
The Red-tailed amazon (Amazona brasiliensis) is a protected species in the station.

References

Sources

1982 establishments in Brazil
Ecological stations of Brazil
Protected areas of Paraná (state)
Protected areas established in 1982
Ramsar sites in Brazil